George and the Dragon is a British situation comedy made by ATV for the ITV network which was transmitted in four series comprising 26 episodes between 19 November 1966 and 31 October 1968.

The regular cast was Sid James, Peggy Mount, John Le Mesurier and Keith Marsh. The show was written by Harry Driver and Vince Powell; Shaun O'Riordan was the director, and Alan Tarrant was the main producer.

Outline 
George Russell (James), a handyman and chauffeur, and Gabrielle Dragon (Mount), a housekeeper, are both employed by Colonel Maynard (Le Mesurier). Also among the staff is Ralph (Marsh), a gardener. George's lascivious behaviour has been responsible for the resignation of 16 previous housekeepers, but Gabrielle, a formidable widow in her forties, will have none of it. The two leading characters are frequently at crossed swords with each other and George regularly schemes to remove her from her job.

Mount herself was unlike the 'battleaxe' characters she tended to play, and had known James for many years by the time of this series. They had worked together in the screen adaptation of the Brian Rix-associated farce Dry Rot (1956). Mount reminded James of his own mother, while Mount found James a convivial colleague. It was while the second series was in production on 13 May 1967 that James had his first heart attack.

Cast 
 Sid James as George Russell
 Peggy Mount as Gabrielle Dragon
 John Le Mesurier as Colonel Maynard
 Keith Marsh as Ralph

DVD release 
Unlike many British television series of its era, George and the Dragon survives in its entirety with no episodes missing, and has been issued as a DVD boxset.

References

External links
 

1966 British television series debuts
1968 British television series endings
1960s British sitcoms
1960s British workplace comedy television series
English-language television shows
ITV sitcoms
Television shows set in London
Television shows shot at ATV Elstree Studios